The Gotham Independent Film Award for Best Documentary is one of the annual Gotham Independent Film Awards. It was first presented in 2004 with Jonathan Demme's The Agronomist being the first recipient of the award.

Winners and nominees

2000s

2010s

2020s

See also
 Academy Award for Best Documentary Feature
 Independent Spirit Award for Best Documentary Feature

References

Best Documentary
American documentary film awards
Awards established in 2004